Mask Singer 12  was the twelfth season of The Mask Singer, a Thai singing competition program presented by Kan Kantathavorn. The program aired on Workpoint TV on Wednesday at 20:05 from 15 March 2023.

Panel of Judges

First round

Group A

Group B

Group C

Elimination table

References 

The Mask Singer (Thai TV series)